Sjöström is a Swedish surname. Notable people with the surname include:
Axel Gabriel Sjöström (1794–1846), Finnish Romantic poet
Einar Sjöström (1882–1923), Finnish architect, brother of Wilho
Frans Anatolius Sjöström (1840–1885), Finnish architect
Freddie Stroma (born 1987) (né Sjöström), British actor
Fredrik Sjöström (born 1983), Swedish ice hockey player
Joacim Sjöström (born 1964), Swedish footballer
Juhani Sjöström (1871–1909), Finnish writer
Harri Sjöström (born 1952), Finnish saxophonist
Nell Sjöström  (1933–2021), Swedish sprinter
Olof Adolf Sjöström (1841–1896), Swedish banker
Sarah Sjöström (born 1993), Swedish swimmer
Victor Sjöström (1879–1960), Swedish actor, film director and screenwriter
Wilho Sjöström (1873–1944), Finnish artist, brother of Einar

Swedish-language surnames